Zoltán Varga (1 January 1945 – 9 April 2010) was a Hungarian footballer who played in the 1960s and 1970s.
He was an Olympic gold medalist at the 1964 Summer Olympics in Tokyo. He played for Ferencvárosi TC when they won the Inter-Cities Fairs Cup in 1965, beating Juventus 1–0 in the final. He also played for Ajax Amsterdam.

He played in Germany for Borussia Dortmund and Hertha BSC, but was banned after he was caught taking bribes to lose matches.

During the period of his ban he played for Aberdeen F.C. in Scotland.

Club career

Career in Hungary
The Ferencváros his professional career. In the professional team played between 1961–1968, a period which is the club's history after World War II was one of the most successful. Varga made 135 career appearances, scoring 53 goals. The club became champion in 1962 and '63, 1964, 1967 and 1968 NB I-season as well.

In these years, Fradi, as one of Europe's best club teams, qualified for the Inter-Cities Fairs Cup series called the International Festival of the major European Football Confederation tournament as well. Today's successor to the European leagues.

In 1962–63 seasons in the semi-finals in a row Varga, and two years later, 1964–65 they won it. Success is not interrupted in 1967, 68 in the runner. Since the Mexican Olympic Games, Varga left the country, so successfully ended the era of Ferencváros.

Career in Europe

Between 1969 and 1972, the German Hertha BSC scored nine in 34 games, 26 games for Aberdeen in Scotland (where he is still considered by many to be the finest foreign import ever to play for the club) scored ten of the Netherlands Ajax 12 games scored two goals, the German side Borussia Dortmund 51 games scored 10. Last was a team player in the Belgian Gent.

International career
Between 1964 and 1968 he had been included in the Hungarian national team 12 times and scored 2 goals. In 1964, Spain's European Championship team bronze medal for the author made his debut as a member of the team. In 1966 he participated in the World Cup in England, but could not play due to an earlier injury.

He received a gold medal as member of Hungary's Olympic Team in the Tokyo Olympic Games, in 1964. During the 1968 Olympics in Mexico City he had left the Hungarian Team Camp before the matches and did not return to Hungary.

Death
On 9 April 2010, Varga was playing in an old-boys football match at Danuvia when he was taken ill. He collapsed and, despite efforts by teammates and emergency responders to resusciate him, died at the age of 65.

References

External links
 
 
 
 
 

1945 births
2010 deaths
Hungarian footballers
Association football midfielders
Hungary international footballers
Olympic footballers of Hungary
Olympic gold medalists for Hungary
Olympic medalists in football
Footballers at the 1964 Summer Olympics
Medalists at the 1964 Summer Olympics
1964 European Nations' Cup players
1966 FIFA World Cup players
Ferencvárosi TC footballers
Standard Liège players
Aberdeen F.C. players
Borussia Dortmund players
FC Augsburg players
Hertha BSC players
K.A.A. Gent players
AFC Ajax players
Scottish Football League players
Bundesliga players
Eredivisie players
Hungarian expatriate footballers
Expatriate footballers in Belgium
Expatriate footballers in West Germany
Expatriate footballers in the Netherlands
Expatriate footballers in Scotland
Hungarian expatriate sportspeople in Belgium
Hungarian expatriate sportspeople in West Germany
Hungarian expatriate sportspeople in the Netherlands
Hungarian expatriate sportspeople in Scotland
Hungarian football managers
Hungarian expatriate football managers
Budapest Honvéd FC managers
Ferencvárosi TC managers
Diósgyőri VTK managers
Győri ETO FC managers
Sportspeople from Fejér County
Nemzeti Bajnokság I managers